Jennie Lynne Connor  (born 1958) is a New Zealand medical researcher and academic, and as of 2018 is a full professor and chair of preventive and social medicine at the University of Otago.

Academic career
After a 2001 PhD titled Estimating the contribution of driver sleepiness to car crash injuries : the Auckland car crash injury study at the University of Auckland, Connor moved to the University of Otago, rising to full professor. Much of Connor's recent research focuses on the health effects of drinking.

In the 2023 New Year Honours, Connor was appointed an Officer of the New Zealand Order of Merit, for services to alcohol harm reduction.

References

Living people
New Zealand women academics
University of Auckland alumni
Academic staff of the University of Otago
New Zealand medical researchers
1958 births
Officers of the New Zealand Order of Merit